An acoustic shadow or sound shadow is an area through which sound waves fail to propagate, due to topographical obstructions or disruption of the waves via phenomena such as wind currents, buildings, or sound barriers.

Short-distance acoustic shadow

A short-distance acoustic shadow occurs behind a building or a sound barrier. The sound from a source is shielded by the obstruction. Due to diffraction around the object, it will not be completely silent in the sound shadow. The amplitude of the sound can be reduced considerably, however, depending on the additional distance the sound has to travel between source and receiver.

Long-distance acoustic shadow
Anomalous sound propagation in the atmosphere can occur in certain conditions of wind, temperature and pressure. Such conditions enable sound to travel in refraction channels over long distances until returning to the earth's surface, and it thus may not be heard in intervening locations. As one website refers to it, "an acoustic shadow is to sound what a mirage is to light". For example, at the Battle of Iuka, a northerly wind prevented General Ulysses S. Grant from hearing the sounds of battle and sending more troops. Many other instances of acoustic shadowing were prevalent during the American Civil War, including the Battles of Seven Pines, Gaines' Mill, Perryville and Five Forks.  Indeed, this is addressed in the Ken Burns's documentary The Civil War, produced by Florentine Films and aired on PBS in September 1990.  Observers of nearby battles would sometimes see the smoke and flashes of light from cannon but not hear the corresponding roar of battle, while those in more distant locations would hear the sounds distinctly.

Two diarists John Evelyn and Samuel Pepys heard from London the naval guns of the Four Days' Battle, which ranged over the southern North Sea between England and the Flanders coast. However the guns were not heard at all in towns on the coast nearer to the action:

Further reading
Garrison Jr., Webb, Strange Battles of the Civil War, Cumberland House, 2001,

See also
  for a fuller explanation of the phenomenon.
 Gobo (recording)

References

External links
 Acoustic Shadows - What is an acoustic shadow and how does it work? - Lisa
 Acoustic Shadow

Hearing
Waves
Acoustics